Surimana (Aymara for a sort of potatoes (white and long), also spelled Sorimana) is a mountain in the Wansu mountain range  in the Andes of Peru, about  high. It is situated in the Cusco Region, Chumbivilcas Province, Santo Tomás District. Surimana lies northwest of Qullpa K'uchu and Minasniyuq.

References 

Mountains of Cusco Region